Françoise de Montglat née de Longuejoue (d. 1633) was a French court official. She was the royal governess of King Louis XIII of France and his siblings.

Françoise de Montglat was the daughter of Thibaut de Longuejoue and Madeleine Briçonnet. She married Robert de Harlay (1550-1607), Baron de Montglat and royal chamberlain, in 1579.

She was appointed royal governess to the children of King Henry IV of France. She was given the responsibility for the king's children with Queen Maria of Medici, as well as for the children of the king with his mistresses, who were raised together. She was referred to as "Mamangat" by her royal charges, who corresponded with her as adults.

Her daughter Jeanne de Harlay (later Jeanne de Saint George) became a playmate and sub-governess of the royal children, who called her "Mamie", and was later lady-in-waiting and correspondent to Henrietta Maria and, finally, appointed governess to Anne Marie Louise d'Orléans, Duchess of Montpensier.

Her letters are preserved.

References 
  Lettres intimes de Henri IV
 A. Lloyd Moote,  Louis XIII, the Just, 1991
 Katie Whitaker,  A Royal Passion: The Turbulent Marriage of Charles I and Henrietta Maria, 2010
 Victor L. Tapié,  France de Louis XIII Et de Richelieu. Anglais, 1984
 Dominic Pearce,  Henrietta Maria, 2015

1633 deaths
17th-century French people
Governesses to the Children of France 
17th-century French women
Louis XIII
Medieval French nobility
Court of Henry IV of France